O Rappa was a Brazilian reggae/rock band from Rio de Janeiro, Brazil. Combining many styles such as rock, reggae, funk, hip hop and samba, Many of O Rappa's songs contain sharp protests against the social problems in Brazil and the members of the band themselves are supporters of numerous social projects.

History
In 1993, reggae artist Papa Winnie came to Brazil but had no band to play shows with him. He immediately picked four people: Nelson Meirelles, Marcelo Lobato, Alexandre Menezes and Marcelo Yuka as the band. After Papa Winnie's shows, the four decided to stay together picking Falcão as the 5th member and vocalist.

In 1994, they released their first album, on Warner, O Rappa. It was initially only known to small groups within the working class suburbs of Rio de Janeiro. In 1996 the album Rappa Mundi was released. Most of the music was a success, especially the cover of "Hey Joe", a song made famous by The Jimi Hendrix Experience.

However it was not until the third album Lado B Lado A ("Side B Side A") in 1999, that O Rappa gained widespread fame selling over 150 000 copies of that album. Their video clip for their song Minha Alma ("My Soul") was also held in high regard winning many MTV Brasil's Vídeo Music Awards.

In November 2000, drummer Marcelo Yuka was shot during a robbery. He tried to avoid the assault by slamming his car against the bandits. The incident left him a paraplegic and he was forced to leave the band. He was replaced by Marcelo Lobato.

In August 2001, the group released its first live album, Instinto Coletivo. It featured a couple of tracks recorded in the studio with the participation of Sepultura and Asian Dub Foundation.

On 7 July 2007, O Rappa performed at the Brazilian leg of Live Earth in Rio de Janeiro.

In 2008 they released 7 Vezes ("7 times"). In 2010, the band launched the live album and the DVD O Rappa Ao Vivo Na Rocinha ("Live in Rocinha"), which was recorded during a concert at Rocinha, Rio de Janeiro's largest favela. The album featured the band's biggest hits as well as many b-side tracks.

Considered by many as the most iconic and respected contemporary Brazilian band, they're consistent on their work. Capable of bringing many rhythms together and combining it into unique melodies that are impossible to label. Their rock and reggae influences are clear but other elements added to the melodies give the band the status of pioneers.

On May 3, 2017, the group announced on Facebook that after the end of their tour in February 2018, it will pause with no current plans to return.

Discography

Studio

Live albums

Collected

Video albums

Singles

Band members 

 Last line-up
Marcelo Falcão - lead vocals, rhythm guitar, acoustic guitar (1993-2018)
Xandão (Alexandre Menezes) - lead guitar (1993-2018)
Lauro Farias - bass, synth bass and backing vocals (1996-2018)
Marcelo Lobato - keyboards and backing vocals (1993-2018); drums (2001-2008); samplers and vibraphone (2008–18)

 Former members
 Marcelo Yuka - drums (1993-2001)
 Nelson Meirelles - bass (1993-1996)

 Touring members
 Felipe Boquinha - drums (2013–2018)
 Marcos Lobato - keyboards and samplers (2002–2018)
 Negralha - turntables, samplers, percussion and backing vocals (1998–2018)
 Wellington Soares - percussion (1996-2000)
 Cleber Sena - drums, percussion (1999-2013)
 Pedro Leão - acoustic guitar, craviola and bandolin (2005)
 Bernardo Aguiar & Juninho - percussion (2005)
 Alessandra Rodrigues, Play & Vinícius Falcão - backing vocals (2005)

References

Musical groups established in 1993
Musical groups disestablished in 2018
1993 establishments in Brazil
2018 disestablishments in Brazil
Brazilian rock music groups
Rap rock groups
Musical groups from Rio de Janeiro (city)